Shilpa Natarajan is an independent acoustic singer-songwriter and a playback singer and was a music presenter on Chennai Live 104.8FM, based in Chennai, India. In 2015 she performed with the Beef Sappad Trio. She is an ATCL diploma graduate in Western Classical Music (Performance).

Early life and education
As a child Natarajan attended school in Muscat.  She later moved with her family to Chennai, where she attended Vidya Mandir in the neighbourhood of Mylapore and joined the school's  Carnatic orchestra.
Natarajan had grounding in classical Carnatic music for close to two decades. Her first Guru was her mother Maheshwari Natarajan, followed by Vijayalakshmi Subramanian and Shuba Ganesan. She currently learns from Smt. Champa Kumar.
Natarajan is also a student of Western classical music.

Career
Natarajan used to work with a Corporate Group based in Chennai and worked on her music during the weekends.

Her first entry into the Tamil music industry was in 2008 when she participated on a contest TV Show, Airtel Super Singer- Season 1. While she did not make it to the finals, she was invited to be a guest performer along with a lot of others from the show.

Natarajan then sang a song for a Tamil television serial- 'Puriyadha Pudhir', on Raj TV.

She entered the Tamil playback industry in 2012 with a song for a feature film titled 'Marina'. The song which she was a part of, 'Vanakkam Chennai', has received more than 2 million hits  and Shilpa was invited to sing the song on Star Vijay's Super Singer.

She has sung for Disney Tamil and Nickelodeon and her voice can be heard as a singer, on both 'Nala' from Lion King and Ariel from 'Little Mermaid' (in Tamil).

She has collaborated with Vandana Srinivasan, a playback singer in Chennai and Prithvi Chandrasekar of Krimson blend on a cover of Amit Trivedi's 'Pareshaan' from Ishaqzaade.

Shilpa collaborates with Chennai's theatre company StrayFactory Entd. and has been a part of The Metroplus Theatre Festival and the Short + Sweet Festivals with Ganga at Rishikesh and Maya From Madurai.

Shilpa has been a part of Girishh Gopalakrishnan's Vidiyum Munn by singing, along with Susheela Raman and Ramshanker S., the song, 'Penne'.

She has also sung the title track, "Hi", for Vishal Chandrasekhar's 'Hi da' which is yet to release.

Natarajan began to write songs in 2011 and released her Tamil single, "Yenakku Nee Sondhama" which was produced by G.D. Prasad. Subsequently, she released an English single "Shadow On your Wall".  In 2011, Shilpa collaborated with G.D. Prasad, on a bi-lingual song - "String of Shining Pearls"

In 2013, Natarajan worked with several independent musicians in Chennai and was a part of a Tamil single  "Thedal", composed by Ramshanker S. That year she took part in The Hindu's Metroplus Theatre festival and 'The Fete De La Musique'.

Natarajan's next single "Dirty Little Secret", was premiered at The Metroplus Theatre Festival in August 2013, and at about that time she was featured on Zee Thamizh 's 'Isai Unplugged' show, along with a few other independent musicians, as part of a band called 'Untitled'.

In 2015, she was performing with a group called "The Beef Sapad Trio". In 2016 the group performed at a Beatles Tribute concert in Chennai.

In 2016 Natarajan performed with the Madras Musical Association choir. In 2017 she released her debut EP, Bubblewrap in two languages. The EP included 5 tracks in English and 2 in Tamil, and was produced by Naveen Samson Benjamin. Bubblewrap features musicians including Joslin Julius, Hariprasad, Vijay B., Shravan Sridhar, Biggu Chandilya, Adithi Deborah and Varun Ram Iyer. The EP is a mix of Indie pop, world, Indie-folk and other genres with tinges of other genres like alternative, carnatic and swing mixed with the music. 'Yenakku Nee Sondhama' was featured on BBC Asian Radio Network on Ashanti Omkar's on 19 March 2017. "Bubblewrap", the title track of the EP was featured on BBC Asian Radio Network on Ashanti Omkar's on 26 March 2017. 

Apart from being a singer- songwriter, Shilpa Natarajan is the founder of Oshi's Vocal Academy, where she works with people of all ages starting from 5 years on Voice Training, Music Theory and Reading Sheet Music.

Beef Sappad Trio 
Beef Sappad Trio is a parody act from the city of Chennai. The act comprises Dr. Yohan Chacko (Veal Smith), Sandeep John (TenderLoins of Punjab aka TLPJ) and Shilpa Natarajan (BarbieQ). The act write parody songs based on current affairs and are strictly humorous.

While they have written and performed many songs, some of their YouTube-released tracks are NRI song, The Biryani song, Monsoon Christmas (a song based on the Chennai floods of 2015) and most recently The Endodontist song.

Discography

Animated series
 Biriken (Title Track)
Sally Bollywood (Title Track)- Discovery Tamil 
Lion King 3- Disney Tamil
Peter Pan- Disney Tamil
Concho Bay (Animated Series) – Tamil
Mickey & Donald have a laugh- Telugu

Associated acts
Strayfactory- Short & Sweet Festival- 'Maya from Madurai', directed by Pooja Balu, written by Naren Weiss, starring Venkatesh Harinathan, Ajay Ayyappan and Shilpa Natarajan
Fete De La Musique 2013- With Krimson Blend @ Goethe Institut, Chennai
StrayFactory (Experimental Theatre at Jaaga, Bangalore)
StrayFactory (Ganga @ Rishikesh, Madras Meals- The Great Indian Blogologues)
Banaras Shop Quartet (Ganga @ Rishikesh, The Hindu Metroplus Theatre Festival- 2012)
Vandanam ( Pareshaan –A cover )

References

External links
Official website
Shilpa Natarajan at Soundcloud

Living people
1987 births